There are many historical regions of Central Europe. For the purpose of this list, Central Europe is defined as the area contained roughly within the south coast of the Baltic Sea, the Elbe River, the Alps, the Danube River, the Black Sea and the Dnepr River.

These historical regions were current in different time periods – from medieval to modern era – and may often overlap. National borders have been redrawn across those regions many times over the centuries, so usually a historical region cannot be assigned to any specific nation. The list below indicates which present-day states control the whole or a part of each of the listed regions.

Former Austro-Hungarian empire 
Cisleithania
Transleithania
For Bosnia and Herzegonvina, please refer to these two articles:
Austro-Hungarian rule in Bosnia and Herzegovina
Regions of Bosnia and Herzegovina

The kingdoms and lands represented in the Austrian Imperial Council (Cisleithania)

Lands of the Crown of Saint Stephen (Kingdom of Hungary: Transleithania)

Other regions

See also 
 Contemporary related subdivisions
 Austria
 Belarus
 Czech Republic
 Germany
 Poland

 Historical related regions
 Croatia
 Hungary
 1000–1920
 1941–1945
 In Slovakia
 Lithuania
 Poland
 Romania
 Slovakia
 Ukraine

Geography of Central Europe
Europe, Central
Europe, Central
Central Europe
History of Central Europe
Central Europe